Notre Dame Seminary Senior High School is an all male second cycle educational institution founded by Very Rev. Fr. Armand Lebel. The first batch of thirty-one (31) students were admitted on September 16, 1960. It currently has a population of about five-hundred (500) students studying either General Science or General Arts. The school is located in Navrongo in the Kasena-Nankana Municipality of the Upper East Region of Ghana. 

In line with the motto of the School, "Scientia et Fide" (Knowledge and Faith or Knowledge in the service of Faith) and the intention of the founding fathers, Notre Dame Seminary SHS seeks to provide an integral education at the pre-tertiary level by training its students to become effective channels of God's love and instruments in the development of the country.

History 
The School was established by the Catholic Church through the arduous work of its missionaries led by Rev Father Lebel on 8 July 1960. The School had an initial enrollment of 31 students and was mainly managed by the Catholic Church until 1990 where the Government of Ghana through the Ghana Education Service (GES) took over in 1996. The current  Rector of the School is Rev. Father Francis Kodelogo, a catholic priest..Records show that the school is one of the best schools in Ghana: it students' performance in the West  African School Certificate Examinations (WASSCE) has been excellent and extraordinary.

References 

High schools in Ghana
Educational institutions established in 1960
Schools in Ghana
Upper East Region
1960 establishments in Ghana